Luka Nurmi (born 26 April 2004) is a Finnish racing driver. He has won the title of Ferrari Challenge World Championship as well as the Porsche Sprint Challenge NEZ Series. He won the both championship series as the youngest competitor.
In addition, in early seasons of his career he won many medals in Karting Finnish Championship series and in other international series. He has also won the Championship in Finland's most popular circuit racing series, Legends - also as the youngest driver in its history.

Since karting he has determinately developed his career towards top speed in international GT-series.

Career

Karting 2009–2018 

Born in Tampere, Finland, at age of five Nurmi started competing in karting as he became interested in the thrilling and fast-paced world of motorsport. Determined work in the junior karting groups delivered silver medal in the Rotax Max Finland series, bronze medal in BNL series and bronze medal in Rotax MAX Challenge World Championships.

In season 2017 he won silver medal in OKj-group of Karting Finnish Championship series. He was also awarded with title of Finnish Newcomer driver.

In season 2018 he continued in Finnish Karting Championship series and won bronze medal in OK-group before making a decision to continue his career in faster cars.

RX Academy 2019 

The RX Academy, which was run by Jussi and Kalle Pinomäki (SET Promotion), was driven by Renault Clio RS cars in the Nordic and the Baltic countries. In addition to driving, the academy included physics, mental as well as media coaching. For Nurmi the racing season, which ended in fifth place in the series, was very developing in all those sectors and provided a good foundation for his motorsport career.

Porsche Sprint Challenge NEZ 2020–2021 

Finnish Relaa Racing team chose Nurmi for its junior driver to Porsche Sprint Challenge NEZ Racing series for seasons 2020 and 2021. Nurmi thanked the team manager Raimo Niemi for the trust he had give as in his first GT year Nurmi won the bronze medal of the series. After fierceful driving in next year he improved two positions and won the Championship title as the youngest driver to win the Porsche Sprint Challenge NEZ racing series in its history.

Legends 2020–2021 
In order to maintain his skills behind the steering wheel of GT cars and to develop his versatile motorsport career, Nurmi successfully competed in Legends, which has become the most popular circuit racing series in Finland. In season 2020 he won the Semi-PRO Championship series and in 2021 the PRO Championship series. In both classes, he collect the titles as the youngest driver in the series history.

Ferrari Challenge Europe 2021

Career highlights 
 2016: Karting Rotax MAX Challenge Finland Silver
 2016: Karting BNL-series Bronze (Rotax)
 2016: Rotax MAX Challenge World Finals Bronze
 2017: Karting Finnish Championship series Silver (OKj)
 2017: Finnish Rookie of the Year
 2018: Karting Finnish Championship series Bronze (OK)
 2019: RalliCross RX-Academy: 5th
 2019: Porsche Sprint Challenge NEZ Bronze
 2020: Legends Finland Champion (Semi-Pro)
 2020: Porsche Sprint Challenge NEZ Champion
 2021: Legends Finland Champion (Pro)
 2021: Ferrari Challenge Europe Bronze Medal
 2021: Ferrari Challenge World Finals Champion

Racing record

Career summary

References

External links 
 
 

Finnish racing drivers
2004 births
Living people
Sportspeople from Tampere
NASCAR drivers
21st-century Finnish people
Lamborghini Super Trofeo drivers
Ferrari Challenge drivers